The Ship Security Alert System (SSAS) is part of the ISPS code and is a system that contributes to the International Maritime Organization's (IMO)'s efforts to strengthen maritime security and suppress acts of terrorism and piracy against shipping. The system is an IMO regulated system.  In case of attempted piracy or terrorism, the ship's SSAS beacon can be activated, and appropriate law-enforcement or military forces can be dispatched.  An SSAS beacon operates with similar principles to the aircraft transponder emergency code 7500.

See also

Cospas-Sarsat
GMDSS
International Convention for the Safety of Life at Sea
International Maritime Organization
Long-Range Identification and Tracking (LRIT)

References

External link

Emergency communication
Law of the sea
Maritime communication
Maritime safety
Rescue equipment